Historia Placitorum Coronæ or The History of the Pleas of the Crown is an influential treatise on the criminal law of England, written by Sir Matthew Hale and published posthumously with notes by Sollom Emlyn by E. and R. Nutt, and R. Gosling (the assigns of Edward Sayer), for F. Gyles, T. Woodward, and C. Davis in 1736. The book was published despite an instruction in Hale's will that none of his manuscripts was to be printed after his death unless he had ordered the publication during his lifetime. This was defended by Emlyn on the basis that it was a work of enormous importance; that he appeared to have revoked this instruction in a codicil; and that, in any event, it was obvious that he had intended to publish it. He further observed that the order was the result of fear that the text would be altered or abridged.

The book is divided into two parts. The first part deals with substantive law and the second part deals with procedure.

Bibliography
.
.
.
.

See also
Books of authority

References

 

1736 books
1736 in law
English criminal law
Legal treatises